Athina Mary "Tina" Onassis Niarchos (19 March 1929 – 10 October 1974) was an English-born Greek-French socialite and shipping heiress, the second daughter of the Greek shipping magnate Stavros Livanos and Arietta Zafiraki. She was best known as the first wife of Aristotle Onassis, but she later married her older sister Eugenia's widower, Stavros Niarchos. She was also the elder sister of George Stavros Livanos.

Marriages and family
She was married three times. Her husbands were:
Aristotle Onassis (28 December 1946 – 1960); with him she had two children, Alexander Onassis (1948–1973) and Christina Onassis (1950–1988). She divorced him upon her discovering that he was having an affair with the opera singer Maria Callas. 
John Spencer-Churchill, Marquess of Blandford (23 October 1961 – March 1971), later  11th Duke of Marlborough
Stavros Niarchos (21 October 1971 – 1974), her sister Eugenia's widower.

After her divorce from Aristotle Onassis, she dropped her married name and resumed her maiden name, Livanos, until her marriage to Spencer-Churchill.

In October 1971 she married her third husband, Stavros Niarchos, her sister's widower.

Her son with Onassis, Alexander Onassis, died at the age of 24 in January 1973, as a result of injuries sustained during an airplane crash in Athens.

Athina Niarchos died on 10 October 1974 in the Hôtel de Chanaleilles, the Parisian mansion that she shared with her husband. Her death was officially ruled by pathologists as having resulted from an acute edema of the lung, but has also been attributed to her suffering a drug overdose. She was buried next to her sister at the Bois-de-Vaux Cemetery in Lausanne, Switzerland.

Her daughter, Christina Onassis, sued Stavros Niarchos, her mother's widower, for her mother's estimated US$250 million (in 1974 dollars) estate claiming the marriage should be annulled under Greek law. Christina later dropped the lawsuit and Niarchos returned all of his wife's money as well as her jewelry, artwork and other personal effects to Christina.

Her only living descendant is her namesake granddaughter, Athina Onassis, Christina's daughter.

Notes

References

1929 births
1974 deaths
Blandford
British expatriates in France
British expatriates in the United States
Drug-related deaths in France
Greek socialites
Livanos family
Niarchos family
Onassis family
Tina
Aristotle Onassis